The Kazakhstan men's national water polo team is the representative for Kazakhstan in international men's water polo.

Results

Olympic Games

World Championship

1994 – 12th place
1998 – 11th place
2001 – 12th place
2009 – 16th place
2011 – 13th place
2013 – 12th place
2015 – 11th place
2017 – 11th place
2019 – 14th place
2022 – 14th place

World Cup
2014 – 6th place

World League

2010 – 10th place
2011 – 13th place
2012 – 5th place
2014 – Intercontinental Preliminary round
2015 – Intercontinental Preliminary round
2016 – Intercontinental Preliminary round
2017 – 6th place
2018 – 8th place
2019 – 7th place
2020 – 6th place

Asian Games

1994 –  Gold medal
1998 –  Gold medal
2002 –  Gold medal
2006 –  Bronze medal
2010 –  Gold medal
2014 –  Gold medal
2018 –  Gold medal

Asian Swimming Championships

2012 –  Gold medal
2016 –  Silver medal

Asian Water Polo Championship

2009 –  Silver medal
2012 –  Gold medal
2015 –  Bronze medal

Asian Cup
2012 –  Gold medal

Islamic Solidarity Games
2005 –  Silver medal

Current squad
Roster for the 2020 Summer Olympics.

See also
 Kazakhstan men's Olympic water polo team records and statistics

References

External links
Official website

Men's national water polo teams
 
Men's sport in Kazakhstan